David or Dave Armstrong may refer to:

Politicians 
David H. Armstrong (1812–1893), US Senator from Missouri
David L. Armstrong (1941–2017), American lawyer and politician
David Malet Armstrong (1926–2014), Australian philosopher
David Armstrong (Wisconsin politician), Wisconsin state legislator

Sportspeople 
Dave Armstrong (footballer) (born 1942), English footballer
Davey Armstrong (1956–2021), American boxer
David Armstrong (bobsleigh) (born 1964), British Olympic bobsledder
David Armstrong (footballer, born 1954) (1954–2022), English international footballer
David Armstrong (footballer, born 1987), Northern Irish footballer

Theatrical professionals 
David Armstrong (director), American theatre director
Dave Armstrong (playwright) (born 1961), New Zealander playwright

Others 
Dave Armstrong (Catholic apologist) (born 1958), Catholic apologist and writer
Dave Armstrong (producer), Canadian record producer
Dave Armstrong (sportscaster) (born 1957), American television sports announcer
David Armstrong (photographer) (1954–2014), American art photographer
David G. Armstrong (born 1969), American physician and professor of surgery
David Morrison Armstrong (1805–1873), merchant, insurance agent and political figure in Quebec
J. David Armstrong Jr., American academic and president of Broward College
David Armstrong, a fictional character from the 2001 video game Operation Flashpoint: Cold War Crisis
David Armstrong-Jones, 2nd Earl of Snowdon (born 1961), member of the British Royal Family, more commonly known as David Linley